John M. Harmon (born July 16, 1944) is an American lawyer who served as United States Assistant Attorney General for the Office of Legal Counsel during the Jimmy Carter administration.

Biography

Harmon was born in Statesville, North Carolina. From 1962 to 1966 he attended the University of North Carolina receiving his Bachelor of Arts and his Juris Doctor from Duke University School of Law in 1969.

Until 1970 he worked as a law clerk for Judge Griffin Bell in the United States Court of Appeals for the Fifth Circuit and Eleventh Circuit. From 1970 to 1971 he was a law clerk in the office of Associate Justice Hugo Black in the United States Supreme Court, after that until 1972 in the office of Chief Justice Warren E. Burger. For the next four years Harmon practiced law with Coudert Frères and served as U.S. Representative to Court of Arbitration of International Chamber of Commerce in Paris, France.

In 1977 he was assigned United States Assistant Attorney General by Jimmy Carter. He worked in the Office of Legal Counsel until 1981. Afterwards Harmon entered the law firm Graves, Dougherty, Hearon, Moody & Garwood in Austin, Texas where he practices Business Litigation and international Litigation.

Awards
Harmon is listed in Best Lawyers in America 2001–2010.
Since 1986 he is Honorary French Counsul.

See also 
 List of law clerks of the Supreme Court of the United States (Chief Justice)
 List of law clerks of the Supreme Court of the United States (Seat 1)

References

1944 births
Duke University School of Law alumni
Law clerks of the Supreme Court of the United States
Living people
People from Statesville, North Carolina
Texas lawyers
United States Assistant Attorneys General for the Office of Legal Counsel
United States Deputy Attorneys General
University of North Carolina at Chapel Hill alumni